Kevin M. McCarty (born January 6, 1972) is an American politician currently serving in the California State Assembly. He is a Democrat representing the 7th Assembly District, which encompasses a portion of the Sacramento metropolitan area, including most of the city of Sacramento.

McCarty is a member of the California Legislative Black Caucus. Prior to being elected to the Assembly in 2014, he served on the Sacramento City Council representing the 6th district, which includes part of the eastern and southeastern parts of the city.

Background
McCarty graduated with a bachelor degree in political science from CSU Long Beach and has a master's degree in public policy and administration from Sacramento State. Before his service as an elected official, McCarty served as Policy Director to former California Lieutenant Governor Cruz Bustamante, and as an Assembly Budget Committee consultant to then-Assemblywoman Denise Moreno Ducheny. While on the City Council, McCarty worked as a legislative advocate for Preschool California.

6th City Council District

McCarty served on the Sacramento City Council from 2004-2014. Representing many of Sacramento's older neighborhoods, McCarty advocated for safe housing, inspections of Sacramento's numerous rental housing units, gun control, and the creation of after-school programs.  Council member McCarty along with Darrell Fong voted against a $257 million subsidy to develop a downtown entertainment and sports complex for the Sacramento Kings.

7th Assembly District
In 2014, incumbent Democrat Assemblyman Roger Dickinson ran for the California State Senate, leaving the California's 7th Assembly District vacant. McCarty ran again and this time was successful, defeating fellow Sacramento City Councilman Steve Cohn.

2004 election
In the 2004 election, McCarty faced John Boyd, the director of Shriners Hospital for Children. McCarty defeated him by a 62% to 38% margin.

2008 election
McCarty did not face any opposition in his 2008 reelection bid. He did gain notoriety as the lone city councilman who declined to take sides in the mayoral primary between Heather Fargo and Kevin Johnson. However, by the general election, he decided to support Fargo's unsuccessful reelection bid.

2010 Assembly bid
In 2010, Assembly Member Dave Jones was term limited. McCarty lost a close primary election to Sacramento County Supervisor Roger Dickinson, who went on to win the general election.

2012 election
In 2012, McCarty was challenged by information technology manager Mitch Netto. He easily won in the primary election by a 3 to 1 margin.

2014 election
In 2014, McCarty was elected to represent California's 7th Assembly District, defeating fellow Sacramento City Councilmember Steve Cohn.

2016 election

2018 election

2020 election

Personal life 
McCarty was born and raised in the Sacramento area. He currently resides in the Elmhurst neighborhood with his wife, Leticia García, and their twin daughters Victoria and Barbara.

References

External links 

 
 Campaign website

1972 births
Living people
California State University, Long Beach alumni
California State University, Sacramento alumni
Sacramento City Council members
Democratic Party members of the California State Assembly
21st-century American politicians